Virtual Audio Cable is a software product based on WDM multimedia driver that allows a user to transfer audio streams from one application to another. Any application is able to send an audio stream to the input side of a "virtual cable" while a corresponding application can receive this stream from the output side. Since all transfers are made digitally, there is no loss in sound quality. VAC is the audio equivalent of a MIDI loopback device such as MultiMid or Hubi, and can be used instead of "Stereo Mix" or "What U Hear" features of audio adapters.

If more than one application is sending audio through an output virtual cable, VAC is able to mix all of the streams together or create separate corresponding virtual input cables.  Similarly, more than one application is able to receive audio from an input cable, whether it's sharing the same audio data with another target or receiving its own personal audio stream. VAC is useful for recording an application's audio output in almost real time or transferring a sound stream to another application so it may process it. A person could use two or more software audio generators, synthesizers or sequencers to produce audio streams and send them to a VAC output cable and record the mixed stream from the VAC input cable using any type of recording software.

Because VAC routes audio streams in almost real time, it is able to be utilized in various manners. A person is capable of using VAC to record an output audio stream from an application that normally does not allow saving the audio to files. Practically, the input port records the audio signal (for example from a music player) and sends it to the destination program (such as a sound processor or analyzer) using the output port. A user could also manipulate VAC into recording conversations through Voice Over IP (VoIP) or Internet telephony applications such as Skype (for example, with SAM Broadcaster), produce live audio podcasts, redirect audio channels to multiple monitors, or even decode weather faxes.

Features
Windows XP/2003/Vista/7/8/8.1/10/11 platforms (32-Bit and 64-Bit)
Native WDM/KS audio technology
Up 256 Virtual Cables (Windows limits the number of Multimedia Extensions devices to 32)
1..20 milliseconds per timer event (formerly interrupt)
1..100 pin instances
Supports almost any of fixed point PCM audio formats (Floating point formats are not supported)
Low sound latency with maximal interrupt frequency (1000 Hz, 1 ms period).
Unlimited number of Kernel Streaming clients connected to each port
RT Audio (WaveRT) protocol support with notification events, packet mode, clock and position registers. Clock registers are bound to Virtual Cables so all streams in each cable are coherent.
Signal mixing between output port clients
PCM format conversion
Volume control features
Channel scattering/gathering mode
Control Panel application to dynamically configure cables

References

External links
 

Digital audio
Audio software
Audio format converters
Audio mixing software
Audio recording software
Windows-only software